Jordan Pace is an American politician of the Republican Party. He is the member of the South Carolina House of Representatives representing District 117. In the 2022 general election for South Carolina House of Representatives District 117, he defeated Democratic incumbent Krystle Matthews, who had been a member of the South Carolina House since 2018. Matthews was running simultaneously for the US Senate seat held by Republican incumbent Tim Scott, who ultimately defeated her in that race.

Pace serves on the Medical, Military, Public and Municipal Affairs Committee.

Statements were issued by Henry McMaster, Governor of South Carolina who won his re-election bid, and Drew McKissick, chair of the South Carolina Republican Party.

In 2023, Pace was one of 21 Republican co-sponsors of the South Carolina Prenatal Equal Protection Act of 2023, which would make women who had abortions eligible for the death penalty. After several Republicans withdrew their support for the bill, Pace said the media had "overblown the death penalty aspect", called the chances of a woman being given the death penalty "infinitesimally small", and said the opposition was "an absurd fallacy".

References

External links
Election Results, 2022 South Carolina General Election

Living people
Republican Party members of the South Carolina House of Representatives
21st-century American politicians
Year of birth missing (living people)